The 2009 ICC Africa Under-19 Championships were a series of two events that served as qualification for the 2009 ICC Under-19 Cricket World Cup Qualifier. The first stage of the championship saw the affiliate nations competing for a place in the finals. This competition was held from 27 February to 5 March in Maputo, Mozambique. Initially it was intended for two teams to go through but due to concern over Kenya's ability, they were included in the qualifying finals limiting the free spaces to one. As a result, only the champions, Sierra Leone, made it through into the eight team finals.

The finals were held from 27 April to 4 May in Lusaka, Zambia. The top two teams qualified for the international qualifier and these were Uganda and surprisingly, the affiliate team of Sierra Leone.

Africa Under-19 World Cup Qualifier Affiliates

Teams

Six African affiliate nations participated in this competition and these were:

Matches

The teams played each other in a round robin format with the final placings being decided by wins and then run rate.

Final Table

Africa Under-19 World Cup Qualifier Finals

Teams

Eight teams competed in the second part of the competition, these being the seven associate nations plus the winners of the affiliate tournament.

Associate nations:

Qualified via affiliate tournament:

Matches

The teams played one another in a round robin format with the final placings being decided by wins and then net run rate.

Final Table

References

International cricket competitions in 2009
Cric
2009 in Zambian sport
ICC Africa
Sport in Maputo
International sports competitions hosted by Mozambique
International sports competitions hosted by Zambia
Sport in Lusaka
Under-19 regional cricket tournaments